The Confederación Sudamericana de Rugby (CONSUR) B Division Championship in Luque, Paraguay was held during August 2013.

2013 CONSUR B Championship

Number in brackets indicates the pre-tournament IRB ranking of team

Related Page 
 2013 South American Rugby Championship "A"
 2013 South American Rugby Championship "C"

External links 
 Details

References 

2013
2013 rugby union tournaments for national teams
B
rugby union
rugby union
rugby union
rugby union
South American Rugby Championship "B"
International rugby union competitions hosted by Paraguay